Sonderkommando ("special unit" in German) most commonly refers to the extermination camp Sonderkommando in Nazi Germany but may also refer to:

 Sonderkommando Arjas, a Latvian auxiliary police force during the Nazi German occupation
 Sonderkommando Blaich, a Luftwaffe operation in North Africa
 Sonderkommandos of Einsatzgruppen
 Sonderkommando Dänemark, a counterintelligence unit in occupied Denmark during WWII
 Sonderkommando Elbe, a Luftwaffe task force
 Sonderkommando photographs, secretly taken images of the operation of the Sonderkommandos
 SS-Sonderkommandos, special action units of the Schutzstaffel
 Sonderkommando Nord, RSHA's unit leading the pro-German resistance movement in Finland
 Sonderkommando 2000, a counterintelligence unit in occupied Greece during WWII
 Sonderkommando Rote Kapelle, a counterintelligence unit in occupied Paris during WWII
 Sonderkommando Pola, a commanding unit of Pola Flotilla during WWI
 Sonderkommando Kaiserliche Marine Türkei, a German unit tasked with aiding Ottoman allies defending Dardanelles in WWI